Sharafuddin Lutfillaev (born 9 September 1990) is an Uzbekistani judoka.

He won a medal at the 2019 World Judo Championships.

Personal life
Sharafuddin Lutfillaev is the first judoka in the Uzbekistan to have NFT. Lutfillaev's official NFT was released in April 2022.

References

External links
 
 
 

1990 births
Living people
Uzbekistani male judoka
Place of birth missing (living people)
Judoka at the 2014 Asian Games
Asian Games competitors for Uzbekistan
Judoka at the 2020 Summer Olympics
Olympic judoka of Uzbekistan
21st-century Uzbekistani people